Robert Speck (28 April 1909 – July 13, 1979) was a Romanian field handball player of German origin who competed in the 1936 Summer Olympics. He was part of the Romanian field handball team, which finished fifth in the Olympic tournament. He played all three matches.

References
Robert Speck's profile at Sports Reference.com

1909 births
1979 deaths
Field handball players at the 1936 Summer Olympics
Olympic handball players of Romania
Romanian male handball players